Dead Accounts is a Broadway play written by Theresa Rebeck. The comedy premiered at the Music Box Theatre on November 29, 2012 and closed on January 6, 2013. The production starred Norbert Leo Butz and Katie Holmes, and was directed by Jack O'Brien.

Production
Dead Accounts opened on Broadway at the Music Box Theater on November 29, 2012. The play was first performed at the Cincinnati Playhouse in the Park in February 2012.

The Broadway production was directed by Jack O'Brien, and starred Norbert Leo Butz and Katie Holmes, in her return to Broadway (after her 2008 debut in All My Sons). Initially only a 16-week run on Broadway, it was announced that Dead Accounts would close early due to poor ticket sales. The last performance was on January 6, 2013.

Premise
Dead Accounts centers on Jack's unexpected return to Cincinnati, after spending several years in New York City  His family, included his sister Lorna, and mother Barbara, immediately suspect he is in some sort of trouble. This is confirmed when Jack's soon-to-be ex-wife, Jenny arrives, and reveals Jack has stolen 27 million dollars.

Characters and Broadway cast 
Jack, a banker from New York who returns to his home in Ohio — Norbert Leo Butz 
Lorna, Jack's sister, who lives at home to take care of her aging parents — Katie Holmes
Barbra, Jack's mother — Jayne Houdyshell
Phil, Jack's best friend — Josh Hamilton
Jenny, Jack's estranged wife — Judy Greer

Reception
Dead Accounts received mixed-to-negative reviews from most critics. Entertainment Weekly called the comedy "engaging, but unsatisfying", but said Holmes was not believable. Ben Brantley of The New York Times criticized the show for not settling on a single tone or subject matter. However, he did praise Butz's performance, as well as the supporting parts of Hamilton and Greer. Brantley also noted that Holmes was more at ease than she was in her 2008 Broadway debut in All My Sons.

References

2012 plays
Broadway plays
Plays by Theresa Rebeck
Plays set in Ohio
Cincinnati in fiction